Karsten Alnæs (born 29 May 1938) is a Norwegian author, historian, and journalist, who has dual degrees in history and literature from the University of Oslo. He worked as a journalist and taught at the Norwegian School of Journalism. His bibliography includes 15 novels, 3 children’s books, a collection of novellas, and a number of non–fiction works.

Alnæs was awarded the Brage Prize in 1992 for the novel Trollbyen, and the honorary prize in 2003 for the cultural impact of his literary work. He received the Dobloug Prize in 1998.

His series The History of Norway (5 volumes; 1996–2000) received the Sverre Steen Prize of the Norwegian Historical Society and topped the bestseller list for non–fiction in Norway. It became the basis of a TV-series, with Alnæs as host and director. His book series The History of Europe (4 volumes; 2003–2006) has been translated into several languages.

Alnæs was twice elected president of the Norwegian Authors' Association 1985–1987 and 1999–2001, and has  been active in PEN International. He is a speaker on the international lecture circuit and serves as the lone representative for the Scandinavian countries on the European Cultural Parliament.

He was born in Hønefoss, and is a cand.philol. by education.

Bibliography 
 1971 Roles and Patterns in Mass Media. Non–Fiction. Journalism. [Roller og mønstre in massemedia]*
 1971 On Access to Language. Non–Fiction. Journalism. [Om språklig tilgjengelighet]
 1973  	Language and Mass Media. Non–Fiction. [Språk og massemedier]
 1975  	Wasps. Short Stories. [Veps – noveller]
 1976  	The Campaign.  Historical Novel. [Felttoget]
 1977  	Gaia. Novel.
 1978  	Lord of the Ocean, Serf of the Sea. Historical Novel. [Havherre og sjøtrell]
 1981  	Big Bang and Blue Days. Novel. Kjempesmell og blå dager - roman
 1982  	The Retinue of Fleeing Kings. Novel [Flyktende kongers følge]
 1983  	Come Love. Novel. [Kom kjærlighet]
 1984    The History of Norway and the World Before 1850. Non–Fiction. Textbook for upper secondary school. [Norges- og verdenshistorie før 1850.]
 1985  	Island. Novel. [Øy]
 1986  	The Sea Monster. A Narrative. [Sjøgossen]
 1986  	The Green Land. Children’s book. [Det grøne landet]
 1989	The Boy From Duck River. Historical Novel. [Even 1814]
 1992 	The Magic City. Novel. [Trollbyen]
 1993 	A Peculiar City. Non–Fiction. Coauthor of Anthology on Oslo. [Den forunderlige by]
 1994 	Sabina. Novel.
 1996 	There is a Land. The History of Norway. Vol. 1. [Det ligger et land. Historien om Norge 1]
 1997 	Under Foreign Rule. The History of Norway. Vol. 2. [Under fremmed styre. Historien om Norge 2]
 1998 	Toward Modern Times. The History of Norway. Vol. 3. [Mot moderne tider. Historien om Norge 3]
 1999 	Toward a New Working Day. The History of Norway. Vol. 4. [En ny arbeidsdag. Historien om Norge 4]
 2000 	Barcelona. A Catalan Fireworks. A Cultural Guide. [Barcelona. Et katalansk fyrverkeri]
 2000 	Fifty Rich Years. The History of Norway. Vol. 5. [Femti rike år. Historien om Norge]
 2001 	The History of Norway in Story and Picture. [Historien om Norge i bilder og fortellinger]
 2002 	Lisbon. A Travel Diary.
 2002 	A Stranger. Novel. [En fremmed]
 2003   The History of Norway. An Instructional Guide. [Historien om Norge – spørrebok]
 2003 	The History of Europe I, 1300–1600. [Historien om Europa 1 (1300–1600)]
 2004 	The History of Europe II, 1600–1800. [Historien om Europa 2 (1600–1800)]
 2005 	The History of Europe III, 1800–1900. [Historien om Europa 3 (1800–1900)]
 2006 	The History of Europe IV, 1900–1945. [Historien om Europa 4 (1900–1945)]
 2007 	Strapping My Skis. Cultural History. [Jeg spenner mine ski]
 2008	Back Behind All Colors. Novel. [Bakenfor all farger]
 2009	Sophie, Don’t Die! Historical Novel. [Ikke dø, Sophie!]

Note: Norwegian titles are given in brackets

Awards  
 1992 	The Brage Prize for The Magic City [Trollbyen].
 1992 	The Norwegian Booksellers' Prize for The Magic City.
 1998	The Dobloug Prize.
 2000	The Sverre Steen Prize of the Norwegian Historical Association.
 2003 	The Honorary Brage Prize.

References

1938 births
Living people
20th-century Norwegian novelists
21st-century Norwegian novelists
20th-century Norwegian historians
Dobloug Prize winners
People from Ringerike (municipality)
21st-century Norwegian historians